This is a list of the next scheduled events designated as "World Cup". There are a number of notable world cups in popular sports. Such a competition is generally considered the premier competition in its sport, with the victor attaining the highest honour in that sport and able to lay claim to the title of their sport's best.

Basketball
 2018 FIBA Women's Basketball World Cup

Cricket
 2019 Cricket World Cup
 2018 Under-19 Cricket World Cup
 2021 Women's Cricket World Cup

Football

Association football
 2018 FIFA World Cup
 2018 FIFA Club World Cup
 2019 FIFA Women's World Cup
 2018 FIFA U-20 Women's World Cup
 2018 FIFA U-17 Women's World Cup
 2019 FIFA Beach Soccer World Cup
 2020 FIFA Futsal World Cup
 2026 FIFA World Cup

Rugby
 2018 Rugby World Cup Sevens
 2019 Rugby World Cup
 2021 Rugby League World Cup

Hockey

Field hockey
 2018 Men's Hockey World Cup
 2018 Women's Hockey World Cup

Netball
 2019 Netball World Cup

Tennis
 2018 Davis Cup
 2018 Fed Cup

Water sports
 2018 Canoe Slalom World Cup

Winter sports
 2017–18 FIS Alpine Ski World Cup
 2017–18 Bobsleigh World Cup

Other sports
 2018 Roller Derby World Cup